Haqvaran (also Romanized as Ḩaqvarān; also known as Ḩaq Vīrān) is a village in Chahriq Rural District, Kuhsar District, Salmas County, West Azerbaijan Province, Iran. At the 2006 census, its population was 504, in 100 families.

References 

Populated places in Salmas County